Rummy is a generic term for a family of card games.

Rummy may also refer to:

An alcoholic, especially one who is drunk on rum
A nickname for Donald Rumsfeld
 Kedi (2010 film), a Telugu film also known as Rummy
 Rummy (2014 film), a 2014 Tamil film